Semper Paratus is a Latin phrase, meaning "Always Ready". Sometimes shortened to Semper P. It is used as the official motto of some organizations, such as the United States Coast Guard. A 1928 song of the same name is also used as the U.S. Coast Guard's official march, and the phrase appears on the organization's flag.

Usage

Canada
 Semper Paratus is the motto of The Royal Hamilton Light Infantry (Wentworth Regiment) of the Canadian Army formed in 1862 and headquartered at the James Street Armoury in Hamilton, Ontario, Canada.
 Semper Paratus is the motto of The Brockville Rifles a Primary Reserve infantry regiment of the Canadian Army formed 5 October 1866 and headquartered at the Brockville Armoury in Brockville, Ontario, Canada.
 "Semper Paratus" is also the motto of Galt Collegiate Institute (GCI) in Cambridge, Ontario, the first high school in Canada to become a Collegiate Institute (established 1852).

Hong Kong
 Semper Paratus is the motto of Royal Hong Kong Auxiliary Air Force, it is also used by Hong Kong Government Flying Service.

Romania 

 Semper Paratus is the motto of the Romanian Obstacle Course Racing Association - also known as OCR Romania - the organization that founded the Romanian Obstacle Sports Federation (established in 2021).

United Kingdom
 Semper Paratus is the motto used by numerous armigers, including the Barons Clifford of Chudleigh, Armytage baronets, of Kirklees, Yorkshire, and Elphinstone baronets, of Sowerby, Cumberland.
 It is also the family motto of the family Upton and has been used since the 11th Century.
  Tremeirchion Cricket club official motto
  Netherlee Primary School official motto
  New Romney Fire Brigade official motto

United States
Semper Paratus is the motto of the United States Coast Guard, and is the title of their marching song "Semper Paratus".
It is the motto of the U.S. Army 16th Infantry Regiment, Fort Riley, Kansas.
 It was the motto of the United States Navy destroyer tender .
 It is the motto of the Long Beach (California) Fire Department.
 It is the motto of the Bradford County Sheriff's Office of Emergency Management (Starke, Florida).
 It is the motto of the FEMA Region 5 Incident Management Assistance Team (IMAT), Chicago, Illinois.

Australia
 It is the motto of Queensland Fire and Rescue Service, a part of Queensland Fire and Emergency Services
 It is the motto of the 5th Battalion of the 5/6th Battalion, Royal Victorian Regiment
 It is the motto of 'A' Battery, Royal Regiment of Australian Artillery (RRAA). 'A' Battery is the oldest and longest continuous full-time serving unit in the Australian Defence Force. 'A' Battery was established on the 1 August 1871, being also the date of the RRAA birthday.

References

Bibliography

 Canadian Forces Publication A-DH-267-003 Insignia and Lineages of the Canadian Forces. Volume 3: Combat Arms Regiments
 
 

Military mottos
Latin mottos